Brook Hatwell (born 12 March 1983) is a New Zealand cricketer. He played seven first-class and three List A matches between 2011 and 2012. He was also part of New Zealand's squad for the 2002 Under-19 Cricket World Cup.

References

External links
 

1983 births
Living people
New Zealand cricketers
Northern Districts cricketers
Cricketers from Hamilton, New Zealand